Flash Gordon's Trip to Mars is a 1938 Universal Pictures 15–chapter science-fiction movie serial based on the syndicated newspaper comic strip Flash Gordon. It is the second of the three Flash Gordon serials made by Universal between 1936 and 1940. The main cast from the first serial reprise their roles: Buster Crabbe as Flash Gordon, Jean Rogers as Dale Arden, Frank Shannon as Dr. Alexis Zarkov, Charles B. Middleton as Ming the Merciless, and Richard Alexander as Prince Barin. Also in the principal cast are Beatrice Roberts as Queen Azura, Donald Kerr as Happy Hapgood, Montague Shaw as the Clay King, and Wheeler Oakman as Ming's chief henchman.  The serial was followed by Flash Gordon Conquers the Universe (1940).

Plot
When a mysterious beam of light starts disrupting and destroying the Earth's atmosphere, Flash Gordon (Buster Crabbe), Dr. Zarkov (Frank Shannon), and Dale Arden (Jean Rogers) - accidentally accompanied by wisecracking reporter Happy Hapgood (Donald Kerr) - swing into action in Zarkov's rocketship, believing that it could be coming from the planet Mongo. Once in space, however, they discover that the ray is originating from Mars.

Journeying to the fourth planet, they discover that their old enemy from Mongo, Ming the Merciless (Charles B. Middleton), whom they had believed dead, is still alive, and has formed an alliance with Azura (Beatrice Roberts), the Witch Queen of Mars. From Azura's planet, and under her protection, he is operating a gigantic Nitron ray that is destroying Earth's atmosphere. Azura's powers include the ability to transmute people into figures of living clay, condemned to live in darkened caves, and she is hated and feared by most of the population. Conversely, the Clay People, led by their King (C. Montague Shaw), know the secret of how to eliminate Azura's power, but lack the means of escaping the caves to which their ruined bodies restrict them,  to battle her.

Gordon and his party seem to hold the answer to their problem, except that the Clay People do not trust them at first, and end up holding Dale Arden hostage. Ultimately, the Earth visitors and the Clay People become allies in the tandem quest to defeat Azura and stop Ming from destroying the Earth. Flash, Dale, Zarkov, and Hapgood do battle against Azura's magic and her Martian space force, Ming's super-scientific weaponry, the treacherous Forest People, and other dangers on the Red Planet. Finally, they win by the classic strategy of divide-and-conquer, showing Azura that Ming has been plotting behind her back to take power from her.

Azura's alliance with Ming is broken, at the cost of the Queen's own life, but the Clay People are freed from their curse. The evil emperor of Mongo, his Nitron ray destroyed and his escape cut off on all sides by the now hostile Martian forces, is finally destroyed by the accidental result of his own machinations and treachery.

Cast
 Buster Crabbe as Flash Gordon
 Jean Rogers as Dale Arden
 Charles B. Middleton as Ming the Merciless
 Frank Shannon as Dr. Alexis Zarkov
 Beatrice Roberts as Queen Azura
 Donald Kerr as Happy Hapgood
 Richard Alexander as Prince Barin
 C. Montague Shaw as Clay King
 Wheeler Oakman as Tarnak
 Kenne Duncan as Airdrome captain
 Warner Richmond as Zandar

Cast notes:
 Charles Middleton's portrayal of Ming is more reminiscent of the Devil in this serial, as opposed his Fu Manchu-like performance in the first serial.

Production
This serial, the first sequel to the Flash Gordon serial, was based on the 1936 "Big Little Book" adaptation of the strip "Flash Gordon and the Witch Queen of Mongo". According to Harmon and Glut, the location was changed to Mars to capitalize on Orson Welles' famous War of the Worlds broadcast. According to Stedman, this serial preceded that broadcast, which made Universal hastily release a feature version of the serial as Mars Attacks the World to capitalize on the publicity. The film was a box-office success.

Flash Gordon's Trip to Mars was less expensive to make than the first Flash Gordon serial.

Mars Attacks the World
Universal Pictures also prepared a feature-length version of this serial, which was already ready for release in October 1938 when Orson Welles astounded the country with his Mercury Theatre on the Air radio production of H. G. Wells's The War of the Worlds. Universal then quickly had the feature's title changed to Mars Attacks the World, and a week after the Welles broadcast, opened it at a Broadway theater as a major premiere event. The original title for this feature had been Rocket Ship, which was subsequently used for reissues of the first Flash Gordon serial's feature version, which had been originally released under its source serial's title in 1936 in the United Kingdom.

Critical reception
Time in 1938 declared the serial to be "a Grade A cinemedition of the famed King Features strip".

Television broadcasting
In the 1950s, the three serials were broadcast on American television. To avoid confusion with a made-for-TV Flash Gordon series airing at the same time, they were retitled, becoming respectively Space Soldiers, Space Soldiers' Trip to Mars, and Space Soldiers Conquer the Universe. They were shown by PBS U.S. stations, and by the BBC in the United Kingdom – where they aired as Flash Gordon serials, under their original titles.

Chapters

01 "New Worlds to Conquer"
02 "The Living Dead"
03 "Queen of Magic"
04 "Ancient Enemies"
05 "The Boomerang"
06 "Tree-men of Mars"
07 "The Prisoner of Mongo"
08 "The Black Sapphire of Kalu"

09 "Symbol of Death"
10 "Incense of Forgetfulness"
11 "Human Bait"
12 "Ming the Merciless"
13 "The Miracle of Magic"
14 "A Beast at Bay"
15 "An Eye for an Eye"

Source:

References

External links
 
 

1938 films
1930s science fiction action films
1930s science fiction adventure films
American black-and-white films
American science fiction action films
American space adventure films
American sequel films
1930s English-language films
Films about extraterrestrial life
Films based on comic strips
Films directed by Ford Beebe
Films directed by Robert F. Hill
Flash Gordon films
Live-action films based on comics
Mars in film
Films set in New York City
Films set in Washington, D.C.
Universal Pictures film serials
1930s American films